Pope Anterus was the bishop of Rome from 21 November 235 until his death on 3 January 236.

Life
Anterus was the son of Romulus, born in Petilia Policastro, Calabria, Italy. He is thought to have been of Greek origin, and his name may indicate that he was a freed slave.  He succeeded Pope Pontian, who had been deported from Rome to Sardinia, along with the antipope Hippolytus. He created one bishop, for the city of Fondi.

Some scholars believe Anterus was martyred, because he ordered greater strictness in searching into the acts of the martyrs, exactly collected by the notaries appointed by Pope Clement I. Other scholars doubt this and believe it is more likely that he died in undramatic circumstances during the persecutions of Emperor Maximinus the Thracian.

He was buried in the papal crypt of the Catacomb of Callixtus, on the Appian Way in Rome. The site of his sepulchre was discovered by Giovanni Battista de Rossi in 1854, with some broken remnants of the Greek epitaph engraved on the narrow oblong slab that closed his tomb; only the Greek term for bishop was legible. His ashes had been removed to the Church of Saint Sylvester in the Campus Martius and were discovered on 17 November 1595, when Pope Clement VIII rebuilt that church.

Pope Anterus is remembered in the Catholic Church on 3 January and in the Russian Orthodox Church on 18 August.

See also

List of popes
List of Catholic saints

References

236 deaths
3rd-century archbishops
3rd-century Christian saints
3rd-century Romans
Greek popes
Italian popes
Papal saints
People from the Province of Crotone
Popes
Year of birth unknown
3rd-century popes
Patriarchs in Italy
Eastern Orthodox saints